Skollenborg is a small village in Sandsvær in the municipality of Kongsberg in Viken county, Norway. Since 2015 Skollenborg has been a part of the Kongsberg urban area.

Skollenborg is situated in the valley of Lågendalen on the Numedalslågen river. The village is located at the intersection between Norwegian county roads FV40 and FV286 which leads to European route E134. It is situated 86 km from Oslo and about 46 km from Drammen. 

The population of the village was 323 in 2014. Since 2015 population numbers has not been reported separately for Skollenborg, but only for the Kongsberg urban area.

The village of Skollenborg is the site of Skollenborg Station (Skollenborg stasjon), a disused railway station on the Sørlandet Line. The station was served by local trains between Kongsberg via Oslo to Eidsvoll operated by  Norges Statsbaner until 2012. To the west of the village lies the Skollenborg power plant (Skollenborg kraftverk).

Hedenstad Church (Hedenstad kirke) is a medieval stone church. It was built in the 12th century. The bell tower dates from 1782. The interior of the church is mainly from the 1800s. The painted by Dina Aschehoug in 1888. The church was restored in 1889 based upon plans by architect Herman Backer. During the 1950s, the church was restored under the direction of architect Thomas Tostrup (1910-1971) and the artistic consultant Finn Krafft (1895-1967).

References

External links
Hedenstad kirke website

Villages in Buskerud
Populated places on the Numedalslågen
Kongsberg